(S)-Cheilanthifoline is a benzylisoquinoline alkaloid (BIA) which has been isolated from Corydalis dubia and Argemone mexicana.  (S)-Cheilanthifoline is metabolically derived from (S)-reticuline, a pivotal intermediate in the biosynthesis of numerous BIAs. (S)-Cheilanthifoline is the immediate precursor of the BIA (S)-stylopine ((S)-stylopine synthase/CYP719A20), which is the precursor for the alkaloids protopine and sanguinarine.

References

Benzodioxoles
Quinolizidines
Heterocyclic compounds with 5 rings
Methoxy compounds